This is a complete filmography of Pakistani actress and model Babra Sharif.

References

Pakistani filmographies